The Hon. Dr. Patrick Musimba MP (born 5 January 1973 in Kibwezi, Kenya) is a Kenyan politician and Member of the National Assembly representing the Kibwezi West Constituency in Makueni County.He is now vying for the gubernatorial seat of Makueni county in the 2022 elections.   He was first elected to Parliament in March 2013 as an independent candidate, but announced in June 2019 that he was joining the Wiper party.

Musimba earned a  Doctor of Philosophy Degree (PhD) in Entrepreneurship and Enterprise Development, and a Master of Science Degree (MSc) in Entrepreneurship, at the Jomo Kenyatta University of Agriculture and Technology.  He also has a Bachelor of Commerce Degree (BCom) from the University of Nairobi.

Musimba is Chairman of Musimba Investment Group, which has interests in technology, security, agro business, mining, energy, sports promotion and ecotourism.

References 

Living people
1973 births
University of Nairobi alumni